Grape pie is a type of fruit pie made from Concord grape and is part of harvest time traditions in the Finger Lakes region of New York in the United States.
It is particularly sought after at the Naples Grape Festival, and can be found at various shops around town.

Concord grape pie
Grape pie made with Concord grapes is a regional specialty of Western New York, the Finger Lakes region, Pennsylvania and other areas of the United States where the grape is grown as well as Ontario, Canada. Vineyards that grow the grape, which was developed in the U.S., stretch from Western New York across Pennsylvania and into Ohio and Michigan as well as Washington state. Grape pie is a specialty and tradition of Naples, New York, host of the Naples Grape Festival and home to Angela Cannon-Crothers, author of Grape Pie Season.

The traditional recipe, using Concord grapes, is said to taste like wine due to the inclusion of tannins. Variants on the dessert use other grape types and various other ingredients.

The grape pie is part of the traditional cuisine of German immigrants to the region. This tradition is represented at Old Economy, home of a group of communal German immigrants founded in 1824. The pie-making is a "very long process" and includes "skinning the grape, cooking the pulp and separating out the seeds."

See also
 List of grape dishes

References

Further reading
Cecily Brownstone Concord Grape Pie Returns to Spotlight Sep 30, 1976 Los Angeles Times page OC_B34
Mary Meade Time Is Ripe for Concord Grape Pies; Ration Roundup September 4, 1944 page 23 Chicago Daily Tribune

Fruit pies
American pies
Cuisine of New York (state)
Grape dishes
Cuisine of the Mid-Atlantic states